Gamaliel (Heb. גמליאל), also spelled Gamliel, is a Hebrew name meaning "God (אל) is my (י-) reward/recompense (גמל)" indicating the loss of one or more earlier children in the family. A number of influential individuals have had the name:

Hebrew Bible
 The Hebrew Bible refers to Gamaliel, son of Pedahzur, the leader of the tribe of Manasseh during the census of the Israelites in the Sinai desert (Book of Numbers 1:10; 2:20; 7:54,59; 10:23).

Rabbinical authorities
 Gamaliel, also called Gamaliel I or Gamaliel the Elder, a first-century authority on Jewish law
 Gamliel II, also known as Gamliel of Jabneh
 Gamliel III, son of Judah haNasi the redactor of the Mishna, and his successor as Nasi (patriarch)
 Gamliel IV, grandson of Gamliel III, patriarch in the latter half of the 3rd century
 Gamliel V, son and successor of the patriarch Hillel II
 Gamliel VI, grandson of Gamliel V, the last of the patriarchs, died in 425
 Shimon ben Gamliel, the son of Gamaliel I, the Elder 
Shimon ben Gamliel II, the grandson of Shimon ben Gamliel

Gamaliel in Kabbalah
Gamaliel (Qliphah) is the Qliphah associated with the Sephirah Yesod on the kabbalistic Tree of Life.

Gamaliel as a forename
 Gamaliel Bailey (1807–1859), a U.S. journalist
 Gamaliel Bradford (privateersman) (1768–1824), an American privateer
 Gamaliel Bradford (abolitionist) (1795-1839), a physician and early abolitionist from Boston
 Gamaliel Bradford (biographer) (1863–1932), an American biographer, critic, poet, and dramatist
 Gamaliel King (1795–1875), an American architect
 Gamaliel Painter (1742–1819), an American politician
 Gamaliel Ratsey (died 1605), an English highwayman

Gamliel as a surname
 Aryeh Gamliel (1951–2021), Israeli politician
 Gila Gamliel (born 1974), Israeli politician

Gamaliel as a middle name
 Warren Gamaliel Harding (1865-1923), 29th President of the United States
 Raphael Gamaliel Warnock (born July 23, 1969), American pastor and politician

Institutions
Gamaliel Foundation, a Chicago-based non-profit providing training and consultation to affiliated congregation-based community organizations

Places
 Gamaliel, Arkansas, United States
 Gamaliel, Kentucky, United States

Phrase
 "Gamaliel's principle", a principle based on a story in Acts 5 in the Bible
 "Gamalielese", a term coined by H. L. Mencken to mock President Harding's speaking style

Spanish masculine given names